The men's doubles event was held at the 2016 Canberra Tennis International in Canberra, Australia.

Alex Bolt and Andrew Whittington were the defending champions but chose not to defend their title.

Luke Saville and Jordan Thompson won the title after defeating Matt Reid and John-Patrick Smith 6–2, 6–3 in the final.

Seeds

Draw

References
 Main Draw

2016 ATP Challenger Tour
2016 in Australian tennis
2016